Two ships of the Royal Navy have borne the name HMS Test, after the River Test:

 was a  launched speculatively in 1905 and purchased in 1909. She was sold in 1919.
 was a  launched in 1942. She was lent to the Royal Indian Navy between 1946 and 1947 as Neva, and was broken up in 1955.

Royal Navy ship names